The Pearl Jam 2016 North America Tour was a concert tour by the American rock band Pearl Jam. The tour consisted of twenty-six shows in the United States and Canada, including appearances at the New Orleans Jazz Festival and the Bonnaroo Music Festival. This was the band's first tour following the Latin American Tour that finished in 2015.

The first leg of the tour started on April 8 in Sunrise, Florida and finished on May 12 in Toronto. The band then played at the Bonnaroo Festival in June, before playing two shows at Fenway Park, Boston and two shows at Wrigley Field, Chicago in August. Additional festival appearances at the Ride Festival and the Pemberton Music Festival in July were announced after the arena dates had been published.

Rolling Stone listed the tour as one of the 20 hottest tours of 2016. Music website Alternative Nation named it as the greatest Pearl Jam tour to date.

The two shows at Wrigley Field grossed more than $5.7 million, finishing as the 50th-highest-grossing concerts in 2016. The tour was the 45th-highest-grossing tour in North America and the 64th-highest-grossing tour in the world for 2016.

History
The tour started on April 8 at the BB&T Center in Sunrise, a venue the band had not played at before. In Miami the band covered Cat Power's song "Good Woman" for the first time. Chris Joseph writing for the Miami New Times described the show as "emotional, visceral, honest, droll, raw, heartfelt, and political". The tour continued with two more dates in Florida, including the band's first ever show in Jacksonville. On April 16 at the Bon Secours Wellness Arena in Greenville, South Carolina, the band played the whole of their second album, "Vs.", in order for the first time during the show.

On April 18 the band announced that they will not be playing their previously scheduled show in Raleigh on April 20 due to the controversial Public Facilities Privacy & Security Act (also known as House Bill 2). Frontman Eddie Vedder addressed the crowd at the Hampton show about the cancellation in Raleigh saying "It was a hard process because we thought we could still play and make things right and we could fortify all the people on the ground working to repeal this despicable law". Bruce Springsteen and Ringo Starr also cancelled concerts in North Carolina in protest of the bill. At the concert in Columbia, Vedder called out Senator Lee Bright, who is also proposing a bill similar to HB2. At the same show, Pearl Jam paid tribute to Prince, who had died earlier that day, with Vedder saying "Prince was probably the greatest guitar player we've ever seen" before playing a snippet of "Purple Rain".

Midway through the first leg of arena shows, Pearl Jam headlined the New Orleans Jazz & Heritage Festival, playing for two hours and fifteen minutes, the longest set of the festival. Again, the band paid tribute to Prince before playing their song "Even Flow", a track Prince had covered live on his Live Out Loud Tour in 2013. They finished their set at the festival with a cover of Neil Young's song "Rockin' in the Free World" and were joined onstage with Josh Klinghoffer and Chad Smith of the Red Hot Chili Peppers and Nathan Followill of Kings of Leon.

The US part of the first leg concluded with Pearl Jam playing two sold-out shows in Philadelphia and two sold-out shows in New York City. At the second Philadelphia show, the band started the night by playing the whole of their debut album, "Ten", in order. At the second show in New York City at Madison Square Garden, the band were first joined onstage with Rick Nielsen and Tom Petersson of Cheap Trick to perform Cheap Trick's song "Surrender". Later that night, Sting joined Pearl Jam onstage, with them playing "Driven to Tears" by The Police.

Pearl Jam then played four shows in Canada, starting with the Videotron Centre in Quebec City. Originally the band were scheduled to play two consecutive nights in Toronto at the Air Canada Centre, but the second date was moved back one day to May 12 because of the NBA Playoff match with the Toronto Raptors. On May 10 at the first show in Toronto, the band played the whole of their sixth studio album "Binaural" in order as part of the set. During the encores for both shows in Toronto, the band were joined onstage with Donna Grantis of 3rdeyegirl.

Two days prior to their show at the Bonnaroo Music Festival, Pearl Jam played a surprise show at Third Man Records in Nashville, Tennessee. During the performance, they were joined onstage by the label's founder, Jack White. At Bonnaroo, the band's start time was delayed due to severe weather. On July 9 at the Ride Festival, Pearl Jam played the song "Angel" for the first time since 1994. At the Pemberton Music Festival on July 17, Pearl Jam covered "Dream Baby Dream" by Suicide in tribute to Alan Vega who died two days earlier.

In August the band played two shows at Fenway Park in Boston. On the first night they covered Aerosmith's song "Draw the Line" for the first time. At the second Boston show, they again covered "Draw the Line", this time with Aerosmith's bassist Tom Hamilton joining the band. Later the same month, they concluded the tour by playing two shows at Wrigley Field. At their second Wrigley show, they were joined onstage with Dennis Rodman while the band played the song "Black, Red, Yellow".

Tour dates

Notes

Band members
Pearl Jam
Jeff Ament – bass guitar
Stone Gossard – rhythm guitar
Mike McCready – lead guitar
Eddie Vedder – lead vocals, guitar
Matt Cameron – drums

Additional musicians
Boom Gaspar – Hammond B3 and keyboards

References

External links
 Setlists on Pearl Jam's site

2016 concert tours
Pearl Jam concert tours